Edmund Brooke Alexander (October 6, 1802 – January 3, 1888) was an officer in the United States Army in the Mexican-American War through the American Civil War who rose to the rank of brevet Brigadier General in 1865.

Early career
Alexander was born in Haymarket, Virginia and an 1823 graduate of the United States Military Academy at West Point, New York – along with Lorenzo Thomas, Alfred Mordecai and George S. Greene.

He was a cadet at the Military Academy, Oct. 6, 1818, to July 1, 1823, when he was graduated and promoted in the Army to Brevet Second Lieutenant in the 6th Infantry. He was shortly after promoted to Second Lieutenant in the 3d Infantry with the same date of rank.

He served on frontier duty at Fort Atkinson, Council Bluffs, Iowa, 1824; in garrison at Detroit, Mich., 1824‑25, — Green Bay, Wis., 1825‑26; Jefferson Barracks, Mo., 1826‑27; and Ft. Armstrong, Ill., 1828‑29; on Recruiting service, 1829‑30; on frontier duty at Jefferson Barracks, Mo., 1830; and at Natchitoches, Louisiana, 1830‑31.

He served at Fort Towson, in the Indian Territory from 1831 to 1835; on Quartermaster duty at Fort Towson, I. T., 1833‑34, Fort Jesup, Louisiana, 1834‑35, Fort Towson, I. T., 1835, Fort Jesup, La., 1835‑38, Fort Smith, Arkansas, 1839, Fort Towson, I. T., 1840, Fort Jesup, La., 1840, Fort Towson, I. T., 1840.

He served at Fort Smith, Arkansas from 1840 to 1846, during which he was briefly assigned to Washington, D. C. in 1844.

Mexican War
Alexander was brevetted major at the Battle of Cerro Gordo on April 18, 1847, and lieutenant colonel at the Battles of Contreras and Churubusco on August 20 during the Mexican-American War.

During the War with Mexico, from 1846 to 1848, he was involved in the following battles -

Siege of Vera Cruz, Mar. 9‑29, 1847
Battle of Cerro Gordo, Apr. 17‑18, 1847
Skirmish of Ocalaca, Aug. 16, 1847
Battle of Contreras, Aug. 19‑20, 1847
Battle of Churubusco, Aug. 20, 1847
Storming of Chapultepec, Sep. 13, 1847
Assault and Capture of the City of Mexico, Sep. 13‑14, 1847

After the War with Mexico was concluded he was in garrison at Jefferson Barracks, Mo., 1848‑49; on frontier duty, on march to New Mexico, 1849, Santa Fé, N. M., 1849‑50, Las Vegas, New Mexico, 1850‑51, Fort Union, New Mexico, 1851‑52, Fort McKavett, Texas, 1853 and the march to El Paso in late 1853.

Alexander, as a brevet lieutenant colonel, led the 8th Infantry, when it became the first garrison stationed at Fort Bliss in the El Paso, Texas, area, from January 1854 through March 1855.

In March 1855, promoted to colonel, Alexander was appointed as commander of the new 10th Infantry. 

Colonel Alexander's address upon presenting the unit with regimental colors:

"Officers and Soldiers of the 10th:

"You are formed this morning in line of battle in order that I may present to you the National and Regimental colors. In your hands and to your courage and fidelity are now entrusted the honor of our country and the reputation of your corps. In time of peace so conduct yourselves that neither shall be sullied. In time of war, in the presence of an enemy, remember that these colors are far more precious than life itself; follow wherever they may lead; gather around them in moments of peril, and rather than see yourselves deprived of them, die like faithful soldiers beneath their cherished fold.

E. B. Alexander,

Colonel Commanding."

He later commanded the Utah Expedition of 1857–58 until relieved by General Albert Sidney Johnston.

He served in garrison at Carlisle Barracks, Pennsylvania, 1855; on frontier duty at Fort Snelling, Minnesota from 1855 to 1856; Fort Ridgely, Minnesota, 1856-1857, and the Utah Expedition, 1857 to 1858. He was on a leave of absence from 1858 to 1860.

Civil War
Alexander was on frontier duty at Fort Laramie, Dakota Territory from 1860 to 1862. He then transferred to Fort Kearny, Nebraska, where he served until 1863.

Alexander served during the American Civil War as Acting Assistant Provost Marshal General, Superintendent of Volunteer Recruiting Service, and Chief Mustering and Disbursing Officer for the State of Missouri, with headquarters at St. Louis from May 1, 1863, to Apr. 25, 1866.

Post war
After the war, he was in command of 10th Infantry at Fort Snelling, Minnesota from May, 1866 until he retired from active service on February 22, 1869, under the Law of July 17, 1862, as he was over "the Age of 62 Years."

General Alexander died on January 3, 1888, at Washington, D.C., at the age of 85. He was buried in Oakland Cemetery in St. Paul, Minnesota.

Promotions
Second lieutenant, 3d Infantry – July 1, 1823
First lieutenant, 3d Infantry – December 29, 1827
Assistant quartermaster – December 6, 1833, to July 7, 1838
Captain, staff, assistant quartermaster – July 7, 1838 to June 18, 1846
Captain, 3d Infantry – July 7, 1838
Brevet major – Apr. 18, 1847 (For Gallant and Meritorious Conduct in the Battle of Cerro Gordo, Mexico.)
Brevet lieutenant colonel – Aug. 20, 1847 (For Gallant and Meritorious Conduct in the Battles of Contreras and Churubusco, Mexico.)
Major, 8th Infantry – November 10, 1851
Colonel, 10th Infantry – March 3, 1855
Brevet brigadier general – October 18, 1865 (For Meritorious Services in the Recruitment of the Armies of the United States.)

Namesake
In World War II, a United States Army transport ship, was named in his honor.

References

Citations

Sources

 
  

 

Attribution

Further reading
 Cullum's Register of Graduates of the United States Military Academy

External links

1802 births
1888 deaths
United States Military Academy alumni
American military personnel of the Mexican–American War
People of Missouri in the American Civil War
United States Army colonels
People from Haymarket, Virginia